Kim Young-jae (born February 25, 1995) is a South Korean actor. He played a supporting role in the 2014 teen series Hi! School – Love On.

Filmography

Television series

References

External links 
 Kim Young-jae at SidusHQ 

1995 births
Living people
South Korean male television actors
IHQ (company) artists